Frederique van Hoof (born 17 February 2001) is a Dutch Paralympic table tennis player. She won silver in the Women's team class 6–8 at the 2020 Summer Paralympics in Tokyo.

References

External links
 
 

2001 births
Living people
Dutch female table tennis players
Paralympic table tennis players of the Netherlands
Paralympic silver medalists for the Netherlands
Paralympic medalists in table tennis
Table tennis players at the 2020 Summer Paralympics
Medalists at the 2020 Summer Paralympics
21st-century Dutch women